Nicaragua competed at the 2019 Pan American Games in Lima, Peru from July 26 to August 11, 2019.

In June 2019, the Nicaraguan Olympic Committee named a team of 60 athletes (41 men and 19 women) competing in 13 sports.

During the opening ceremony of the games, beach volleyball athlete Swan Mendoza carried the flag of the country as part of the parade of nations.

Competitors
The following is the list of number of competitors (per gender) participating at the games per sport/discipline.

Medalists
The following competitors from Nicaragua won medals at the games. In the by discipline sections below, medalists' names are bolded.

|  style="text-align:left; vertical-align:top;"|

|  style="text-align:left; width:22%; vertical-align:top;"|

Athletics (track and field)

Nicaragua entered one female athlete. Originally two athletes were named to the team.

Key
Note–Ranks given for track events are for the entire round

Women
Field event

Baseball

Nicaragua qualified a men's team of 24 athletes by finishing in the top four at the 2019 Pan American Games Qualifier in Brazil.

Roster

Group A

Super round

Bronze medal match

Beach volleyball

Nicaragua qualified four beach volleyball athletes (two men and two women).

Bodybuilding

Nicaragua qualified a full team of two bodybuilders (one male and one female).

No results were provided for the prejudging round, with only the top six advancing.

Boxing

Nicaragua qualified nine boxers (four men and five women).

Men

Women

Judo

Nicaragua qualified one female judoka.

Women

Karate

Nicaragua qualified three male karatekas. The team of three athletes was disqualified in the bronze medal match versus Brazil for going over the time limit.

Kata
Men

Rowing

Nicaragua qualified two female rowers. Later two male quotas were redistributed to the country.

Shooting

Nicaragua received three reallocated sports in shooting (two men and one woman).

Swimming

Nicaragua qualified four swimmers (two men and two women).

Taekwondo

Nicaragua qualified one male and one female taekwondo practitioner.

Kyorugi

Weightlifting

Nicaragua qualified two female weightlifters.

Women

Wrestling

Nicaragua received one wild card in the women's freestyle discipline.

Freestyle
Women

References

Nations at the 2019 Pan American Games
Pan American Games
2019